Ch'alla Qullu (Aymara ch'alla sand, also an Aymara rite or custom, qullu mountain, "sand mountain" or "ch'alla mountain", Hispanicized spellings Challacollo, Challa Kkollu) is a mountain in the Andes located on the border of Bolivia and Chile in the Cordillera Occidental. It is about 4,345 metres (14,255 ft) high. Ch'alla Qullu lies north-east of the Salar de Huasco in the Tarapacá Region of Chile and the mountain Piqa, on the border and west of the Salar de Uyuni and Canquella in Bolivia. On the Bolivian side it is situated in the Potosí Department, Daniel Campos Province, Llica Municipality, Canquella Canton.

See also
 Ch'api Qullu
 Wila Qullu
 List of mountains in the Andes

References 

Mountains of Chile
Mountains of Potosí Department
Landforms of Tarapacá Region